Henry Thomas Segerstrom (April 5, 1923 – February 20, 2015) was an American philanthropist, entrepreneur, cultural leader, and patron of the arts. Managing Partner of C.J. Segerstrom & Sons, he was the founding chairman of the Orange County Performing Arts Center, now known as the Segerstrom Center for the Arts.

Life
Henry Thomas Segerstrom was born into a Swedish immigrant family in Santa Ana, California. A farming family, the Segerstroms moved from dairy farming to cultivating alfalfa, eventually specializing in the production and harvesting of lima beans. They would become the largest producers of dried lima bean in the United States.

Education 
In 1939, Henry T. Segerstrom was named valedictorian of Santa Ana High School where he also served as class president. Months later, at age 17 he enrolled in Stanford University, eventually earning a Bachelor of Arts and a Masters of Business Administration degree from Stanford Business School in 1948. His education was interrupted by World War II; he joined the war effort after Pearl Harbor, in 1942.

World War II 

Enlisting in the U.S. Army on June 24, 1942, Henry T. Segerstrom was commissioned a second lieutenant upon graduation from the Field Artillery Officer Candidate School at Fort Sill, Oklahoma on May 27, 1944. He was deployed to the European front as a second Lieutenant, later rising to the rank of captain. In France, he was severely wounded in action during one of the deadliest engagements of the war, the Battle of the Bulge. Facing years of recuperation for shrapnel injuries to his hand, forearm, lower back, and forehead, he returned to California via Dibble General Hospital in Menlo Park. Determined to finish his education at Stanford University, he earned a Bachelor of Arts degree, then enrolled in the Stanford Graduate School of Business, earning his Masters of Business Administration. In 1945, Henry T. Segerstrom was awarded the Purple Heart and the European Theater of Operations Ribbon with Battle Star. He remained on active duty until 1947.

Business career 

As managing partner of the family-owned company, C. J. Segerstrom and Sons, a commercial real estate and retail management organization established in 1898, Henry T. Segerstrom spearheaded commercial development in Orange County, California. Under his guidance, C.J. Segerstrom and Sons transformed a quiet agricultural community into a lively, international destination known as South Coast Metro. In March 1967, Henry T. Segerstrom, along with his cousin Hal T. Segerstrom, Jr., opened a shopping center called South Coast Plaza in one of the family's lima bean fields in rapidly growing Orange County. Originally anchored by a May Company that had opened in late 1966 and Sears, the initial phase of the center was designed by Victor Gruen. It was built the same year as The Irvine Company's Fashion Island in neighboring Newport Beach. South Coast Plaza draws more than 18 million visitors annually to some of the country's most desirable luxury shopping. Envisioning a complex mixture of resources that would come to surround South Coast Plaza, retail and commercial developments integrated the arts into Segerstrom commercial developments.

Early in his business career, Henry T. Segerstrom urged his family to utilize sections of the Segerstrom farm that had been converted by the Army into the Santa Ana Army Air Base. When the government withdrew in 1948, the land was returned to the family along with several warehouses the army had left behind. Under Henry T. Segerstrom's advocacy, the buildings were leased to the family's first tenants; a cannery in Newport Harbor and a truck and transfer center in Anaheim. Later, when the Carnegie Library in Santa Ana was relocated, Henry T. Segerstrom encouraged his family to purchase the building and surrounding property. The library was razed and the property was soon developed into what would become the region's first air-conditioned office building.

Later, Henry T. Segerstrom began planning for a major retail development in an unincorporated stretch of land owned by his family located between Santa Ana and Costa Mesa. Envisioning a thriving retail center, the project commenced in advance of the San Diego Freeway. Working closely with Mayor Alvin Pinkley, the Segerstroms agreed to lease water rights to Costa Mesa and in exchange, the town would pay fees equal to the municipal taxes, guaranteeing ample revenues to Costa Mesa from what would become South Coast Plaza.

In 1949, Henry T. Segerstrom was nominated for the Agricultural Stabilization Committee, winning the chairmanship. An advocate of water reclamation and desalination and a leader in assuring protection of natural water resources, Segerstrom secured agreements and obtained a $40 million grant from the federal government. Today, the region's access to water remains predicated on his early efforts. In 1957, he was elected to a four-year term on the Orange County Water District Board. Re-elected six times, he served 16 years as president. He also became a transit organizer in 1949, bringing in bus lines and advancing the development of road construction and improved traffic flow through the 1990s; he became known as the "Father of the Orange Country Transportation Authority."

Cultural leadership 
By the 1940s there was already a considerable interest in the arts and Orange County was home to many cultural institutions. However, there were no performance spaces or any public art. The Segerstroms owned a sizable amount of land in the Orange County region, generously donating five acres in 1979 to build the foundation for a cultural center that would eventually house three cultural institutions in Orange County—the Philharmonic Society of Orange County, the Pacific Symphony, and the Pacific Chorale. By 1986, they all became one center, originally called the Orange County Performing Arts Center. The center expanded, evolving to become the Segerstrom Center for the Arts, a performance art complex, named in recognition of the Segerstrom's unparalleled generosity, contributions, and dedication.

In 2005 a gift agreement was made for the development of the pedestrian plaza common areas located with Segerstrom Center for the Arts.  Previously pledging $5 million to the Circle of Honor Gift fund, Henry T. Segerstrom, as part of the Cornerstone Gift Agreement committed another $40 million to the development of the Renee and Henry Segerstrom Concert Hall and the overall Segerstrom Center for the Arts.  A portion of the Circle of Honor Gift in the amount of $4 million was restricted for the sole purpose of funding construction costs for the pedestrian plaza and walkway areas of Segerstrom Center for the Arts. Henry T. Segerstrom contributed his time, resources and leadership as a board member to numerous local, national and international institutions, serving on the boards of Bank of America, Safeco, and Southern California Edison Company, among many others. He sat on the boards of various cultural institutions including the White Nights Foundation of America, the American Friends of Versailles, the Museum of Modern Art, New York, the Museum of Contemporary Art, Los Angeles, and the Huntington Library in San Marino, California. Henry T. Segerstrom also served as the National Chairman of the Business Committee for the Arts, headquartered in New York City. A pioneering alliance between Carnegie Hall and the Segerstrom Center for the Arts brought programming from Carnegie Hall's Ancient Paths, Modern Voices festival celebrating Chinese culture to Southern California, resulting in a West Coast festival presented by the Philharmonic Society of Orange County and prominent partner institutions. This marked the first time that Carnegie Hall's live festival programming reached audiences outside New York City.

This institutional alliance was recognized on June 7, 2010, when Carnegie Hall presented Henry T. Segerstrom with the fourth Annual Medal of Excellence. The Carnegie Hall Medal of Excellence honors an executive whose accomplishments in the corporate sector complement Carnegie Hall's stature as one of the premier performance venues in the world. At the Gala, Clive Gillinson, Carnegie Hall's Executive and Artistic Director, presented Henry T. Segerstrom with a Proclamation declaring June 7, 2010, Segerstrom Center for the Arts Day in New York.

Through his dedicated community leadership, gifts of valuable land and financial resources, and commissions of critically significant architecture and sculpture, Henry T. Segerstrom's lifelong commitment to the cultural life of Orange County is distinct. Orange County is now recognized for its sophisticated arts community, its civic and cultural innovation, its inventive entrepreneurial spirit and cutting edge advances in business and technology.

Philanthropy 

Among Henry T. Segerstrom's many honors and accomplishments, he was most proud of his service as founding chairman of the Orange County Performing Arts Center, and his vital role in establishing the Center for Social Innovation at Stanford University's Graduate School of Business. In February 2008, Stanford University presented Henry T. Segerstrom with the prestigious Ernest C. Arbuckle Award for his lifetime of outstanding accomplishments.  Other noteworthy accolades include the prestigious Tree of Life Award of the Jewish National Fund presented by Margaret Thatcher to Henry T. Segerstrom in 1995 for his efforts in developing desalination plants in Southern California. In 1998, he was awarded the title of Commander and bestowed with the Order of the Polar Star by the King of Sweden.

Death
Segerstrom died in Newport Beach, California, on February 20, 2015, at the age of 91.

Legacy
The Segerstrom Center for the Arts, Segerstrom Hall, and Segerstrom Avenue in Santa Ana are named after him.

Awards 

1971  Citizen of the Year, Coast Community College; Hall of Fame inductee, U.S. Army Artillery School

1977  Mardan Award, Mardan Center for Educational Therapy

1981  Meritorious Achievement in the Arts Award, Orange County Arts Alliance; Award for Community Service in the Architectural Profession, Orange County Chapter of the American Institute of Architects

1982  First Patron of the Arts Award, Orange County Master Chorale; First Golden Baton Award, Philharmonic Society of Orange County; Headliner of the Year in Business, Orange County Press Club

1983  Man of the Year, Costa Mesa Chamber of Commerce; Champion of the Year, March of Dimes; Honorary Board Award, South Coast Repertory

1984  Distinguished Achievement Award, National Business Committed for the Arts

1985  Arts & Humanities Award, National Watercolor Society; Ninth Annual Service Award, National Theatre Council

1986  Honorary Degree of Doctor of Laws, Western State University, College of Law; Outstanding Executive in Entertainment and Leisure, Executive Magazine; Thomas Jefferson Award, America Society of Interior Designers; Medici Award, Los Angeles Area Chamber of Commerce

1988  Order of the Polar Star, Honorary Title of Commander, in recognition of Sweden's 350th Anniversary in America, bestowed by His Majesty Carl XVI   Gustaf, King of Sweden; Leonardo da Vinci Award, California Confederation of the Arts; Distinguished Achievement Award, National Business Committee for the Arts (Annual awards in 1984, 1985, 1986 and 1987); Tony Award Winner, South Coast Repertory Theatre, Elected as Second Member - Honorary Board

1990  Man of the Decade Award, The Metropolitan Journal

1992  Los Angeles Beautiful Business and Industry Award, Los Angeles Beautiful, Inc.; Lifetime Achievement Award, University of California Irvine, Paul Merage School of Business

1993  The BCA Leadership Award, National Business Committee for the Arts

1994  Environmental Building Award, American Institute of Architects; Ellis Island Medal of Honor, American Legends Award, National Ethnic Coalition of Organizations Foundations, Inc.

1995  Tree of Life Award, Jewish National Fund; A Key to the City, City of Santa Ana, in recognition of commitment to the arts and culture of Santa Ana; Named Founding Chairman for Life, Orange County Performing Arts Center

1997  Hall of Fame inductee, California Cultural Tourism; 30-year Block AS Service Pin, Stanford Associates

1998  Ethics in America Award, Santa Ana Chamber of Commerce; Hall of Fame inductee, California Tourism Hall of Fame

1999  Art in Public Places Award, Architectural Foundation of Orange County; Orange County Daily Pilot, #1 of 103 Most Influential People of the Newport Beach-Costa Mesa Community

2000  Helena Modjeska Cultural Legacy Award, Community Visionary, Arts in Orange County

2001  Recognition of Leadership to Community and County, Freedom Foundation of Valley Forge; Honorable Mention for the Bridge of Gardens, Orange County Engineering Council; Director of the Year, Forum for Corporate Directors

2002  Honorary Doctorate of Laws Degree, Whittier Law School

2003  Honorary Committee Member, The Freedom Committee of Orange County; Segerstrom Lifetime Achievement Award, Orange County Business Council; Hall of Fame inductee, U.S. Army Artillery School, Fort Sill, Oklahoma

2005  Legacy Award, Orange County Tourism Industry Arts; Visionary Award, Ballet Pacifica; Legacy Prix d'Honneur, Business Committee for the Arts, Orange County

2006  Art in Public Places Award, The Architecture Foundation of Orange County

2007  Hall of Fame-Sigma Chi, Stanford Associates, Stanford University; CELSOC-Award of Excellence for Reneé and Henry Segerstrom Concert Hall, Consulting Engineers & Land Surveyors of California; Visionary Leadership Award, Planning Directors Association of Orange County

2008  The Ernest C. Arbuckle Award, Stanford Graduate School of Business; Founder's Circle, Stanford University; Julian Shulman Communication Award, Woodbury University

2009  Award of Excellence-California Scenario (Noguchi Garden), Orange County Chapter of the American Institute of Architects

2010  The Medal of Excellence Award, Carnegie Hall (one of four such honors bestowed); June 7, Segerstrom Center for the Arts Day, declaration of New York City Mayor, Michael Bloomberg

2012  The Dizzy Feet Foundation Award, in recognition of dance education across the United States, presented by the Music Center and Ovation; Hall of Fame inductee, Stanford Professionals in Real Estate

2013  Lifetime Achievement Award, Costa Mesa Chamber of Commerce and South Coast Metro Alliance

2014  Coaster Lifetime Achievement Award, Coast Magazine Community Awards

2015  Difference Makers-Santa Ana Person of the Year, Santa Ana Chamber of Commerce

Bibliography 

Orange County, an economic celebration

Orange County Today: A Place Like No Other

The Art of Leadership: Building Business-Arts Alliances

Pages mentioned: 1, 21, 60-65

[http://www.oac.cdlib.org/findaid/ark:/13030/kt1f59r654/entire_text/ Fire Mission: 109 The history of Stanford University's Class of 1944, Officer Candidate Class 109 and the experiences of its members in World War II] Unknown Binding: 108 pages
Publisher: R.W. Keusink and R.I. Farrar; 1st edition (1999)
Language: English
ASIN: B0006RQ01A

HENRY T. SEGERSTROM The courage of imagination and the development of the arts in Southern California

References

1923 births
2015 deaths
American real estate businesspeople
Stanford University alumni
Carnegie Hall Medal of Excellence winners
American people of Swedish descent
People from Santa Ana, California
20th-century American philanthropists
United States Army officers
Military personnel from California